The broad-barred white (Hecatera bicolorata) is a moth of the family Noctuidae. The species was first described by Johann Siegfried Hufnagel in 1766. It is distributed throughout Europe and is also found in Turkey, Iran, Israel, Lebanon, Syria, Kirghizia, Tajikistan, western Siberia and China.

Description

This is a fairly small (wingspan 28–35 mm) distinctive species. The white or sometimes bluish-grey forewings are marked with a broad dark olive-fuscous median band. The claviform stigma is black edged; upper stigmata are pale grey with dark centres. The base and outer area of forewing and the head and thorax are pure white. The hindwings are whitish grey with veins and marginal border fuscous. The hindwings are darker in the female.

This species flies at night from June to August and is attracted to light and various flowers.

The larva is brown or green with darker diamonds along the back. It feeds on the flowers and buds of various yellow-flowered Asteraceae such as hawksbeards, hawkweeds and sow thistles. The species overwinters as a pupa.

Notes

References

Chinery, Michael Collins Guide to the Insects of Britain and Western Europe 1986 (Reprinted 1991)
Skinner, Bernard The Colour Identification Guide to Moths of the British Isles 1984

External links

 Taxonomy
Lepiforum e.V.

Hecatera
Moths described in 1766
Moths of Asia
Moths of Europe
Moths of the Middle East
Taxa named by Johann Siegfried Hufnagel